The 2017 Yellow Cup was the 45th edition of the Yellow Cup, held in Winterthur, Switzerland between 06–8 January at the Eulachhalle as a friendly handball tournament organised by the Yellow Winterthur handball club.

Results

Round robin
All times are local (UTC+01:00).

Final standing

References

External links

Tournament Official Website

Yellow Cup
2017 in Swiss sport
January 2017 sports events in Europe